Priyasaki is a soap opera that aired Monday through Friday on Zee Tamil from 8 June 2015 to 1 April 2016 at 7:30PM IST and 4 April 2016 to 20 May 2016 at 9:00PM IST for 242 episodes.

The show starred Mithra Kurian, Nikila Rao, Arnav, Arun Kumar and among others. The show Directed by Parameshwar.

Plot
Divya is working in an event management company and out of her meagre income she manages her family.  She pays all college fees and expenditures of her younger sister Kirthika and her younger brother.  Her father Chandrashekar does not pay a pie to the family.  He repeatedly tries his luck in Real Estate along with other friends, but fails to make any headway.  He tells his family that one day he will become a millionaire and his wife believes it.

Divya the heroine of this serial falls in love with Karthick.  Both their family accept their love and fix their marriage. Love between the two strengthens.  They both are helped as a mediator in their love by Gayathri.   Karthick leaves for Singapore on urgent project work.

As fortune have it Divya is adopted by a rich businessman Rajarathinam.  Subbulaxmi the wife of Rajarathinam had entered into the life of Rajarathinam 20 years back in order to take revenge on him. Divya is a stumble block to her so she plans and throws her out from the house.

Cast
 Mithra Kurian as Dhivya
 Nikhila Rao in a dual role as
Dhivya - She replaced Kurian in the role of Dhivya as face transplantation. The difference in appearance was explained by the character having plastic surgery.
Sathya - Old role played by her, from aired time
 Arnav as Anbazhagan "Anbu"
 Ashwin Kumar as Karthik
 Arun Kumar Rajan as Prabu
 Shalini as Rakshana
 Ferozkhan as Ashok
 Raj Mohan as Chandrasekar  (Dhivya's father)
 Nithya as Dhamayanthi  (Dhivya's mother)
 Raja as Rajarathinam (One who adopt's Dhivya)
 Ravi Shankar Anbu's brother-in-law
 Gayathri as Abhi
 Shabnam
 Surekha
 Sai Madhavi as Abhi's 1st Elder sister
 Minnal Deepa as Abhi's sister
 Balasubramani
 Kamal Hassan

Airing history 
The show started airing on Zee Tamil on 8 June 2015 and It aired on Monday through Friday 7:30PM IST. Later its timing changed Starting from Monday 4 April 2016, the show was shifted to 9:00PM IST time Slot. A show named Mella Thiranthathu Kathavu replaced this show at 7:30PM IST.

See also
 List of programs broadcast by Zee Tamil

References

External links
 

Zee Tamil original programming
2015 Tamil-language television series debuts
Tamil-language melodrama television series
Tamil-language television shows
Television shows set in Tamil Nadu
2016 Tamil-language television series endings